Sere is a minor Ubangian language of the northeastern Democratic Republic of the Congo. The name is variously spelled Serre, Shaire, Shere, Sheri, Sili, Siri, French Chere or prefixed as Basili, Basiri.

References

Languages of the Democratic Republic of the Congo
Sere languages